John Bouchier-Hayes (born 17 December 1944) is an Irish épée, foil and sabre fencer. He competed at the 1964, 1968 and 1972 Summer Olympics.

References

External links
 

1944 births
Living people
Irish male épée fencers
Olympic fencers of Ireland
Fencers at the 1964 Summer Olympics
Fencers at the 1968 Summer Olympics
Fencers at the 1972 Summer Olympics
Irish male foil fencers
Irish male sabre fencers
20th-century Irish people